The canton of Saint-Chamond-Nord is a French former administrative division located in the department of Loire and the Rhône-Alpes region. It was disbanded following the French canton reorganisation which came into effect in March 2015. It consisted of part of the commune of Saint-Chamond, which joined the new canton of Saint-Chamond in 2015. It had 17,001 inhabitants (2012).

See also
Cantons of the Loire department

References

Former cantons of Loire (department)
2015 disestablishments in France
States and territories disestablished in 2015